The inferior frontal sulcus is a sulcus between the middle frontal gyrus and the inferior frontal gyrus.

See also
 Superior frontal sulcus

Additional images

Sulci (neuroanatomy)
Frontal lobe